Siddhanth Thingalaya (born 3 January 1991) is an Indian track and field athlete from Mumbai who specializes in the 110 metre hurdles. He holds the current national record in 110 m hurdles with a time of 13.48 seconds, set at Altis Invitational Meet, USA in June 2017.

Career
Siddhanth started his athlete career while he was 11 years old. Started participating in inter-school events. His first success in 110 m hurdles came when he won the inter-university title at Kochi, in 2008. He followed it up with a Bronze medal at the 9th National Federation Cup junior athletics championship in Lucknow, with time of 14.69 seconds (99.0 cm hurdles).

Siddhanth had training stint in Australia under Mittal Champions Trust and had participated at South Africa under the Mittal Champions Trust and clocked 14.31 seconds at the high altitude Potchefstroom in March 2010. Few months later, he went on to win the silver medal in the Asian Junior Meet in Hanoi, Vietnam,  clocking a personal best 13.96 seconds (99.0 cm hurdles), while setting a new Indian Junior record.  He competed for India in the 2010 World Junior Championships, missing qualifying for the semi-finals by .03 in his heat running 14.09.

Currently Siddhanth is being trained by Gary Cablayan, who is a certified USA track and field coach in the sprints, hurdles and relays. He expertise in elite speed specialist and has been training many NFL players like DeSean Jackson and John Ross (American football). He has also coached two Olympians Olutoyin Augustus from Nigeria and Kenneth Medwood from Belize

Thingalaya improved his personal best timing to 14.20 seconds in the heats of men's 110 m hurdles during the 50th National Inter-State Athletics Championships held in Patiala. In the finals, on 7 August 2010, he broke the Indian National record (held by K. Krishna Mohan) by clocking 13.81 seconds while winning the gold. His margin of victory was an impressive 0.65 s as he finished ahead of his rivals, Tamil Nadu’s P. Muthuswamy and Punjab’s Amandeep Singh.

International competitions

References

External links

1991 births
Living people
Athletes from Mumbai
Indian male hurdlers
Mithibai College alumni
Athletes (track and field) at the 2010 Asian Games
Athletes (track and field) at the 2014 Asian Games
Athletes (track and field) at the 2014 Commonwealth Games
World Athletics Championships athletes for India
Asian Games competitors for India
Commonwealth Games competitors for India